The following is a list of the 445 communes of the Manche department of France.

The communes cooperate in the following intercommunalities (as of 2020):
Communauté d'agglomération du Cotentin
Communauté d'agglomération Mont-Saint-Michel-Normandie
Communauté d'agglomération Saint-Lô Agglo
Communauté de communes de la Baie du Cotentin
Communauté de communes Côte Ouest Centre Manche
Communauté de communes Coutances Mer et Bocage
Communauté de communes de Granville, Terre et Mer
Communauté de communes de Villedieu Intercom

References

Manche